Mount Odlum is located on the border of Alberta and British Columbia on the Continental Divide. It was named in 1917 after Victor Wentworth Odlum, Brigadier-General in the Canadian army during World War I. After the war, he entered politics from 1924-1947.

See also
 List of peaks on the Alberta–British Columbia border

References

Two-thousanders of Alberta
Two-thousanders of British Columbia
Canadian Rockies